The Henry E. Durfee Farmhouse is a historic Greek Revival farm house at 281 Eastford Road in Southbridge, Massachusetts.  Built about 1849, it is a good example of Greek Revival architecture, and a reminder of the now suburban area's once agricultural past.  The house was listed on the National Register of Historic Places in 1989.

Description and history
The Henry E. Durfee Farmhouse is located south of downtown Southbridge, in a rural-residential area at the northeast corner of Eastford and Durfee Roads.  Its basic plan is a -story three bay side hall configuration; the front facade has significant Greek Revival detailing, including corner pilasters and a recessed doorway with corniced lintel as well as transom and sidelight windows.  There is a major addition on the left facade, extending two full stories.  The ell extending to the rear has a large gabled dormer with similar features, and a shed-roof porch across its south side.

The house is, despite its now somewhat suburban setting, a reminder of the rural past of that portion of southern Southbridge.  Construction of the house is estimated to have been in 1849, around the time of Henry Durfee's marriage; the house was built on land that probably belonged to his mother's family.  Its property was once much larger (over ), but has been reduced over the following years to now occupy less than one acre.  The area was basically agrarian until the early 20th century.

See also

National Register of Historic Places listings in Southbridge, Massachusetts
National Register of Historic Places listings in Worcester County, Massachusetts

References

Houses completed in 1849
Houses in Southbridge, Massachusetts
National Register of Historic Places in Southbridge, Massachusetts
1849 establishments in Massachusetts
Houses on the National Register of Historic Places in Worcester County, Massachusetts